Givi Ioseliani (born 25 October 1990 in Tbilisi) is a Georgian football player who currently plays for FC Samgurali Tskhaltubo.

Club statistics

Updated to games played as of 12 May 2013.

References
 MLSZ 
 

1990 births
Living people
Footballers from Tbilisi
Footballers from Georgia (country)
Georgia (country) under-21 international footballers
Association football midfielders
FC Torpedo Kutaisi players
Kecskeméti TE players
FC Sioni Bolnisi players
FC Spartaki Tskhinvali players
FC Samtredia players
FC Zugdidi players
Erovnuli Liga players
Nemzeti Bajnokság I players
Expatriate footballers from Georgia (country)
Expatriate footballers in Hungary
Expatriate sportspeople from Georgia (country) in Hungary